New wave is a loosely defined music genre that encompasses pop-oriented styles from the late 1970s and the 1980s. It was originally used as a catch-all for the various styles of music that emerged after punk rock, including punk itself. Later, critical consensus favored "new wave" as an umbrella term involving many popular music styles of the era, including power pop, synth-pop, ska revival, and more specific forms of punk rock that were less abrasive. It may also be viewed as a more accessible counterpart of post-punk. 
 
A number of common characteristics of new wave music include a humorous or quirky pop approach, the use of electronic sounds, and a distinctive visual style in music videos and fashion. In the early 1980s, virtually every new pop/rock act – and particularly those that employed synthesizers – were tagged as "new wave". Although new wave shares punk's do-it-yourself philosophy, the artists were more influenced by the styles of the 1950s along with the lighter strains of 1960s pop and were opposed to the generally abrasive, political bents of punk rock, as well as what was considered to be creatively stagnant "corporate rock".

New wave commercially peaked from the late 1970s into the early 1980s with numerous major artists and an abundance of one-hit wonders. MTV, which was launched in 1981, heavily promoted new-wave acts, boosting the genre's popularity. In the mid-1980s, new wave declined with the emergence of the New Romantic, New Pop, and New Music genres. Since the 1990s, new wave resurged several times with the growing nostalgia for several new-wave-influenced artists.

Characteristics
New wave music encompassed a wide variety of styles that shared a quirky, lighthearted, and humorous tone that were very popular in the late 1970s and 1980s. New wave includes several pop-oriented styles from this time period. Common characteristics of new wave music include a humorous or quirky pop approach, the use of electronic sounds, and a distinctive visual style in music videos and fashion.  According to Simon Reynolds, new wave music had a twitchy, agitated feel. New wave musicians often played choppy rhythm guitars with fast tempos; keyboards, and stop-start song structures and melodies are common. Reynolds noted new-wave vocalists sound high-pitched, geeky, and suburban.

As new wave originated in Britain, many of the first new wave artists were British. These artists became popular in America, in part, because of channels like MTV, which would play British new wave music videos because most American hit records did not have music videos to play. British videos, according to head of S-Curve Records and music producer Steve Greenberg, "were easy to come by since they’d been a staple of UK pop music TV programs like “Top of the Pops” since the mid-70s." This rise in technology made the visual style of new wave artists important for their success.

The majority of American, male, new wave acts of the late 1970s were from Caucasian, middle-class backgrounds. Scholar Theo Cateforis said these acts intentionally presented these exaggerated, nerdy tendencies associated with their "whiteness" to criticize it and to reflect their identity. A nervous, nerdy persona was a common characteristic of new wave fans, and acts such as Talking Heads, Devo, and Elvis Costello. This took the forms of robotic dancing, jittery high-pitched vocals, and clothing fashions that hid the body such as suits and big glasses. This seemed radical to audiences accustomed to post-counterculture genres such as disco dancing and macho "cock rock" that emphasized a "hang loose" philosophy, open sexuality, and sexual bravado.

Although new wave shares punk's do-it-yourself artistic philosophy, the artists were more influenced by the light strains of 1960s pop while opposed to mainstream "corporate" rock, which they considered creatively stagnant, and the generally abrasive and political bents of punk rock. In the early 1980s, new wave acts embraced a crossover of rock music with African and African-American styles. Adam and the Ants and Bow Wow Wow, both acts with ties to former Sex Pistols manager Malcolm McLaren, used Burundi-style drumming. Talking Heads' album Remain in Light was marketed and positively reviewed as a breakthrough melding of new wave and African styles, although drummer Chris Frantz said he found out about this supposed African influence after the fact. Second British Invasion acts were influenced by funk and disco.

History

Early 1970s
The term "new wave" is regarded as so loose and wide-ranging as to be "virtually meaningless", according to the New Rolling Stone Encyclopedia of Rock. According to music journalist Parke Puterbaugh, the term “does not so much describe a single style as it draws a line in time, distinguishing what came before from what has come after.” It originated as a catch-all for the music that emerged after punk rock, including punk itself, in Britain. Scholar Theo Cateforis said that the term was used to commercialize punk groups in the media:

As early as 1973, critics including Nick Kent and Dave Marsh were using the term "new wave" to classify New-York-based groups such as the Velvet Underground and New York Dolls. In the US, many of the first new wave groups were the not-so-punk acts associated with CBGB (e.g. Talking Heads, Mink DeVille and Blondie), as well as the proto-punk scene in Ohio, which included Devo, the electric eels, Rocket from the Tombs, and Pere Ubu. Some important bands, such as Suicide and the Modern Lovers, debuted even earlier. CBGB owner Hilly Kristal, referring to the first show by Television at his club in March 1974, said; "I think of that as the beginning of new wave". Many artists who would have originally been classified as punk were also termed new wave. A 1977 Phonogram Records compilation album of the same name (New Wave) includes American artists Dead Boys, Ramones, Talking Heads, and The Runaways.

Mid- to late-1970s
Between 1976 and 1977, the terms "new wave" and "punk" were used somewhat interchangeably. 
Music historian Vernon Joynson said new wave emerged in the UK in late 1976, when many bands began disassociating themselves from punk. That year, the term gained currency when it appeared in UK punk fanzines such as Sniffin' Glue, and music weeklies such as Melody Maker and New Musical Express. In November 1976, Caroline Coon used Malcolm McLaren's term "new wave" to designate music by bands that were not exactly punk but were related to the punk-music scene. The mid-1970s British pub rock scene was the source of many of the most-commercially-successful new wave acts, such as Ian Dury, Nick Lowe, Eddie and the Hot Rods, and Dr. Feelgood.

In an interview with CBS News on the topic, singer Martin Fry of ABC described this time period as “an explosion that came out after punk rock swung through Britain – a whole generation that was kind of interested in making music that was more polished. That obviously led to a golden age with Duran Duran, Spandau Ballet, the Human League, ABC, Depeche Mode, many bands like that. We were all a little bit flamboyant."

In the US, Sire Records chairman Seymour Stein, believing the term "punk" would mean poor sales for Sire's acts who had frequently played the New York club CBGB, launched a "Don't Call It Punk" campaign designed to replace the term with "new wave". Because radio consultants in the US had advised their clients punk rock was a fad, they settled on the new term. Like the filmmakers of the French New Wave movement, after whom the genre was named, new wave artists such as  Ramones and Talking Heads were anti-corporate and experimental. At first, most American writers used the term "new wave" exclusively in reference to British punk acts. Starting in December 1976, The New York Rocker, which was suspicious of the term "punk", became the first American journal to enthusiastically use the term, at first for British acts and later for acts associated with the CBGB scene. The music's stripped-back style and upbeat tempos, which Stein and others viewed as a much-needed return to the energetic rush of rock and roll and 1960s rock that had dwindled in the 1970s with progressive rock and stadium spectacles, attracted them to new wave.

The term "post-punk" was coined to describe groups who were initially considered part of new wave but were more ambitious, serious, challenging, darker, and less pop-oriented. Some of these groups later adopted synthesizers. While punk rock wielded a major influence on the popular music scene in the UK, in the US it remained a fixture of the underground.

By the end of 1977, "new wave" had replaced "punk" as the term for new underground music in the UK. In early 1978, XTC released the single "This Is Pop" as a direct response to tags such as "new wave". Songwriter Andy Partridge later stated of bands such as themselves who were given those labels; "Let's be honest about this. This is pop, what we're playing ... don't try to give it any fancy new names, or any words that you've made up, because it's blatantly just pop music. We were a new pop group. That's all."

1980s
In the early 1980s, new wave gradually lost its associations with punk in popular perception. Writing in 1989, music critic Bill Flanagan said; "Bit by bit the last traces of Punk were drained from New Wave, as New Wave went from meaning Talking Heads to meaning the Cars to Squeeze to Duran Duran to, finally, Wham!". Virtually every new pop rock act, and particularly those that included synthesizers in their sound, were tagged as "new wave". Starting around 1983, the US music industry preferred the more generic term "New Music", which it used to categorize new movements like New Pop and New Romanticism. In Britain, journalists and music critics largely abandoned the terms "new wave" and "new music" in favor of subgenre terms such as "synth-pop".

New wave was closely tied to punk, and came and went more quickly in the UK and Western Europe than in the US. At the time punk began, it was a major phenomenon in the UK and a minor one in the US. When new wave acts started being noticed in the US, the term "punk" meant little to mainstream audiences, and it was common for rock clubs and discos to play British dance mixes and videos between live sets by American guitar acts. By the 2000s, critical consensus favored "new wave" to be an umbrella term that encompasses power pop, synth-pop, ska revival, and the soft strains of punk rock. In the UK, some post-punk music developments became mainstream. According to Music critic David Smay writing in 2001:

Popularity in the United States (1970s–1980s)

1970s
In mid-1977, Time and Newsweek wrote favorable lead stories on the "punk/new wave" movement. Acts associated with the movement received little or no radio airplay, or music industry support. Small scenes developed in major cities. Continuing into the next year, public support remained limited to select elements of the artistic, bohemian, and intellectual population as arena rock and disco dominated the charts.

Starting in late 1978 and continuing into 1979, acts associated with punk and acts that mixed punk with other genres began to make chart appearances and receive airplay on rock stations and rock discos. Blondie, Talking Heads, The Police, and The Cars charted during this period. "My Sharona", a single from The Knack, was Billboard magazine's number-one single of 1979; its success, combined with new wave albums being much cheaper to produce during the music industry's worst slump in decades, prompted record companies to sign new wave groups. A new wave music scene developed in Ohio.  In 1980, there were brief forays into new-wave-style music by non-new-wave artists Billy Joel, Donna Summer, and Linda Ronstadt.

1980s
Early in 1980, influential radio consultant Lee Abrams wrote a memo saying with a few exceptions, "we're not going to be seeing many of the new wave circuit acts happening very big [in the US]. As a movement, we don't expect it to have much influence." Later, critical consensus favored "new wave" as an umbrella term involving many popular music styles of the era, including power pop, synth-pop, ska revival, and more specific forms of punk rock that were less abrasive. Lee Ferguson, a consultant to KWST, said in an interview Los Angeles radio stations were banning disc jockeys from using the term and noted; "Most of the people who call music new wave are the ones looking for a way not to play it". Second albums by new wave artists who had successful debut albums, along with newly signed artists, failed to sell and stations pulled most new wave programming, such as Devo's socially critical but widely misunderstood song "Whip It".

In 1981, the start of MTV began new wave's most successful era in the US. British artists, unlike many of their American counterparts, had learned how to use the music video early on. Several British acts on independent labels were able to outmarket and outsell American artists on major labels, a phenomenon journalists labeled the "Second British Invasion". MTV continued its heavy rotation of videos by new wave-oriented acts until 1987, when it changed to a heavy metal and rock-dominated format.

In a December-1982 Gallup poll, 14% of teenagers rated new wave as their favorite type of music, making it the third-most-popular genre. New wave had its greatest popularity on the West Coast. Unlike other genres, race was not a factor in the popularity of new wave music, according to the poll. Urban contemporary radio stations were the first to play dance-oriented new wave artists such as the B-52's, Culture Club, Duran Duran, and ABC.

New wave soundtracks were used in mainstream Brat Pack films such as Sixteen Candles, Pretty in Pink, and The Breakfast Club, as well as in the low-budget hit Valley Girl. John Hughes, the director of several of these films, was enthralled with British new wave music, and placed songs from acts such as The Psychedelic Furs, Simple Minds, Orchestral Manoeuvres in the Dark, and Echo and the Bunnymen in his films, helping to keep new wave in the mainstream. Several of these songs remain standards of the era. Critics described the MTV acts of the period as shallow or vapid. Homophobic slurs were used to describe some of the new wave musicians. Despite the criticism, the danceable quality of the music and the quirky fashion sense associated with new wave artists appealed to audiences.

In September 1988, Billboard launched its Modern Rock chart, the acts on which reflected a wide variety of stylistic influences. New wave's legacy remained in the large influx of acts from the UK, and acts that were popular in rock discos, as well as the chart's name, which reflects the way new wave was marketed as "modern". New wave's indie spirit was crucial to the development of college rock and grunge/alternative rock in the latter half of the 1980s and onward.

Post-1980s revivals and influence

Indie and alternative rock

New wave declined in popularity after the mid-1980s, to be replaced by guitar-driven rock acts who reacted against new wave. In the aftermath of grunge, the British music press launched a campaign to promote the new wave of new wave that involved overtly punk and new-wave-influenced acts such as Elastica, but it was eclipsed by Britpop. During that decade, the synthesizer-heavy dance sounds of British and European new-wave acts influenced Euro disco and trance.

During the 2000s, a number of acts that exploited a diversity of new wave and post-punk influences emerged. These acts were sometimes labeled "New New Wave". AllMusic notes the emergence of these acts "led journalists and music fans to talk about a post-punk/new wave revival" while arguing it was "really more analogous to a continuum, one that could be traced back as early as the mid-'80s".

Electronic music 

During the mid-2000s, new rave combined new wave with elements from genres such as indie rock and electro house, and added aesthetic elements archetypal of raves, such as light shows and glow sticks.

References

Bibliography 
 
 Coon, Caroline. 1988: the New Wave Punk Rock Explosion. London: Orbach and Chambers, 1977. .

Further reading 
 Bukszpan, Daniel. The Encyclopedia of New Wave. Sterling Publishing, 2012. 
 Majewski, Lori: Bernstein, Jonathan Mad World: An Oral History of New Wave Artists and Songs That Defined the 1980s. Abrams Image, 15 April 2014.

External links 

 New Wave Complex – the original page dedicated to new wave music since 1996
 New wave albums statistics and tagging at Last.FM
 New wave tracks statistics and tagging at Last.FM
 Encyclopædia Britannica Definition
 
 1997 Interview with Brat Pack Film Director John Hughes Published MTV 7 August 2009
 
 Rock Against the Bloc  A look back at the punk/new wave movement in Poland by the Krakow Post, 1 February 2010
 
 

 
Punk rock genres
Postmodern art
1970s in music
1980s in music
1970s fads and trends
1980s fads and trends
Rock music genres
Electronic music genres
British styles of music
British rock music genres
American styles of music
American rock music genres
20th-century music genres